Bendigo is a settlement and historic area in Central Otago, in the southern South Island of New Zealand. It is located some 20 kilometres to the north of Cromwell, to the east of the head of Lake Dunstan, on the banks of the Bendigo Creek, a small tributary of the Clutha River.

In pre-European times, the area was not widely used, though an established Māori trail ran through it. Remains of pounamu weapons have been found in the area, as has a waka paddle now in the collection of the Otago Museum, and the remains of some moa egg shells, all suggesting it may have been used as a temporary camping area.

Bendigo first achieved notability in the 1860s, during the Otago Gold Rush. Gold was discovered at Bendigo Creek in 1862. The goldfield around the settlement became one of the country's richest, yielding an estimated 15 to 50 ounces of gold per week. The initial alluvial gold was rapidly played out, but quartz reefs bearing the precious metal were discovered by Thomas Logan in 1863 and many mine shafts were sunk into the rock during the 1860s. By the mid 1870s, the reef was considered Otago's (and the country's) richest. Mining continued in the area until the 1940s. The settlement's name is a relic of this time, having been transplanted from the Australian town of the same name by gold miners who had travelled from the Victorian goldfields.

The remains of the gold field, which was rapidly played out, have been largely preserved, and form the basis of the 1085 hectare Bendigo Historic Reserve. The reserve contains numerous walkways and includes the remains of mineshafts, water races, stamping batteries and the remains of several now-deserted settlement buildings.

Bendigo wine sub-region

Today, Bendigo's economy is based on tourism and wine. The area around Bendigo is one of the major subregions of the Central Otago wine region, with several top wineries and vineyards. As with other parts of the wine region, the main grape variety in the area is pinot noir.

Vineyards and Wineries in the area

Bendigo 

 Aurora Vineyard
 Clutha Ridge
 Lamont
 Misha's Vineyard
 Moko Hills 
 Mondillo
 Mud House Wines
 Prophet’s Rock
 Quartz Reef
 Zebra NZ Vineyards

Tarras and Māori Point 

 Māori Point Vineyard 
 Swallows Crossing Vineyard 
 Tarras Vineyards

References

Populated places in Otago
Geography of Otago
Otago Gold Rush
Wine regions of New Zealand
1862 establishments in New Zealand